David Charles Parker OBE (b.1953) was the Edward Cadbury Professor of Theology (2005-2017) and the Director of the Institute for Textual Scholarship and Electronic Editing at the Department of Theology and Religion, University of Birmingham. His interests include New Testament textual criticism and Greek and Latin palaeography.

Quotes
Commenting on the text of the Greek New Testament, he said:
The text is changing. Every time that I make an edition of the Greek New Testament, or anybody does, we change the wording. We are maybe trying to get back to the oldest possible form but, paradoxically, we are creating a new one. Every translation is different, every reading is different, and although there’s been a tradition in parts of Protestant Christianity to say there is a definitive single form of the text, the fact is you can never find it. There is never ever a final form of the text.

Regarding a textual change in Codex Sinaiticus:
There is also a fascinating place in the codex in the Sermon on the Mount where we can see a change to the text altering the attitude to anger. Jesus says the person who is angry with his brother deserves judgement. But there is a variation on that. If you look at the page in Codex Sinaiticus you will see that somebody’s added a little word in the margin in Greek which changes it to “the person who is angry with his brother without good reason deserves judgement,” and there you’ve got two very different views of Christian life.

Works

Books
 - translated with an introduction and notes

Edited by

Journal articles

 - review article

References

External links

Vetus Latina Iohannes. The Manuscripts in Electronic Transcriptions

British biblical scholars
British theologians
1953 births
Academics of the University of Birmingham
New Testament scholars
Officers of the Order of the British Empire
Fellows of the British Academy
Living people